John Mirk was an Augustinian Canon Regular, active in the late 14th and early 15th centuries in Shropshire. He is noted as the author of widely copied, and later printed, books intended to aid parish priests and other clergy in their work. The most famous of these, his Book of Festivals or Festial was probably the most frequently printed English book before the Reformation.

Life

Biographical information

Nothing is known of Mirk's life apart from what can be gathered from his works. Mirk was a canon of Lilleshall Abbey and later prior of the abbey. Until recently he was generally considered to have written mainly around 1400, but is now thought to have been active from rather earlier – probably the 1380s. His use of language and his name suggest he may have originated in northern England, a region strongly influenced by Norse settlement and culture. He seems to have been deeply committed to pastoral work and his work was directly relevant to the situation of Shrewsbury and its environs in his period. This has similarities to the work of lay catechesis pioneered under John of Thoresby, the Archbishop of York a generation earlier.

Historical context

While biographical information is scant, the religious and political background to Mirk's work is fairly well-known. The defining event in Mirk's background was the Black Death, which killed half the population and had major and protracted consequences for society and economy, as well as the spiritual life of the survivors. However, Shropshire's agrarian crisis started much earlier in the century, with a major cattle murrain and crop failures between 1315 and 1322 Moreover, the prolonged recovery from the disasters was jeopardised by the disorder of the early years of Henry IV's reign, when Owain Glyndŵr's revolt and the uprisings of discontented English nobles devastated many areas.

Lilleshall Abbey, Mirk's home, was a 12th-century foundation, originally intended to follow the rigorist teachings and practices of the Abbey of Arrouaise in northern France. Richard de Belmeis, one of the founders, was dean of the collegiate church of St Alkmund in Shrewsbury and was able to have the college suppressed and its wealth turned over to the abbey. This meant that Lilleshall was closely involved in the town of Shrewsbury, as much of its property was close to, and some within, the town. Lilleshall was brought to a nadir in the early 14th century by the agrarian crisis and the mismanagement and criminality of some abbots, notably John of Chetwynd, but made a surprisingly good recovery, largely through a reorganisation imposed by William de Shareshull. By Mirk's time, the abbey had entered a period of stability, reflected in a relatively high standard of monastic life and liturgy.

However the most powerful monastery locally was Shrewsbury Abbey, a Benedictine house which greatly prized the relics of Saint Winifred. In the late 14th century a new shrine was built to contain them. A group of monks and abbey servants then stole the relics of St Beuno, Winifred's uncle and confessor, from Rhewl and installed them in the abbey church.

Shropshire was dominated by the FitzAlan Earls of Arundel, who had a strong influence on all aspects of political life, including parliamentary representation, in Shropshire and in Shrewsbury Richard FitzAlan, 11th Earl of Arundel was one of the Lords Appellant, opposed to Richard II's policies and his reliance on favourites The Appellants dominated the kingdom from 1387 to 1397 and Richard's brother, Thomas Arundel, became Archbishop of Canterbury. However, in 1397 the king moved against the Arundels and their allies. Earl Richard was arrested on 12 July, attainted, and executed on 21 September, while Thomas went into exile. Shortly afterwards, King Richard and his uncle, John of Gaunt, both stayed at Lilleshall Abbey, in connection with a session of Parliament held from 27 to 31 January in Shrewsbury, which brought looting by members of the royal household. It is not surprising that the Archbishop and Thomas FitzAlan, 12th Earl of Arundel, his nephew, were closely involved from the outset in the new Lancastrian regime of Henry IV, who seized power in 1399. The Battle of Shrewsbury, decisively securing Henry's grip on power, was fought just to the north of the town in 1403, causing considerable damage to the surrounding area. After this, Arundel tightened his grip on Shropshire, operating through an affinity of local landowners pledged to his service. These retainers were confirmed in his circle and in mutual solidarity by participating in his religious benefactions. In 1407, for example, a group of Arundel's retainers, including Robert Corbet, his brother Roger together donated a house in Shrewsbury to the Abbey. This outward piety did not stop them taking part in an armed raid directed against Wenlock Priory a few years later.

It was also in 1407 that William Thorpe is thought to have preached a Lollard sermon from the pulpit of St Chad's Church, Shrewsbury He proclaimed the centrality of the Word of God in preaching and Scripture against reliance on the sacraments and denounced the veneration of images and relics. He was particularly critical of pilgrimage, which he considered both futile in itself and surrounded by numerous social ills. This all clashed with popular religion as practised locally, with its lucrative cult of St Winifred and its highly organised celebration of Corpus Christi, featuring procession of the town's many trades. Thorpe was arrested, together with his associate, John Pollyrbach, and interviewed by Thomas Prestbury, the abbot of Shrewsbury, before being despatched to Archbishop Arundel. Thorpe's Testimony, purporting to recount these interviews, portrays the ensuing interchange as a victory for himself against Arundel, who was an enthusiastic persecutor of Lollards. Whatever the truth of this, Arundel sent commissions to Shropshire in May 1407 to arrest suspected Lollards, suggesting that the movement was perceived as a threat locally. Mirk's works are definitely orthodox and the Festial rejects Lollard teaching both implicitly and explicitly. It is possible that it was deliberately disseminated to combat Lollardy in the Midlands.

Works

Festial

The Liber Festivalis (Book of Festivals) or Festial is a collection of homilies for the festivals of the liturgical year as it was celebrated in Mirk's time in Shropshire. He began with Advent Sunday and worked his way through to All Saints' Day, with a final sermon for the consecration of a church, although the order is disturbed to some extent in some manuscripts. Each sermon features one or more narrations, intended to illustrate the theme. His most important source was the Golden Legend, an immensely popular collection of hagiographies compiled by Jacobus de Voragine in the mid-13th century. However, Mirk chose to write in the vernacular, Middle English, a decision of ambiguous significance. It distinguished him from most other apologists for orthodoxy, as use of the vernacular was a key demand of the Lollards, although it was still not considered heretical in itself. Mirk was faced by the rise of a new class of literate laypeople, as well as by the sometimes unlettered parish clergy whom he acknowledges as his audience. His response was to present a compressed but comprehensive view of Christian teaching that privileges oral tradition above Biblical texts.

Mirk's narrations have often seemed simplistic or "materialist" to later ages. Ford comments that "English sermon collections composed with a popular audience in mind almost invariably favor a story-telling style and have been almost invariably criticized by scholars." The homily for Corpus Christi defends the doctrine of Transubstantiation, which the festival celebrates and the Lollards rejected, with just such a story, concerning Oda of Canterbury.

Mirk goes on explicitly to reject Lollard teaching on images.

Here Mirk is relatively sophisticated, arguing that the very traditional and popular religion that the Lollards rejected, properly interpreted, is not a distraction but actually a spur to a proper appreciation of Christian soteriology.

Mirk's responsiveness to local concerns is particularly evident in his homily for the feast of Saint Winifred. It retells the death and resurrection of the Welsh saint and of the translation of her thaumaturgic relics to Shrewsbury. The same emphasis on the miraculous and on the local continues in the homily for the feast of St Alkmund, hardly known outside the English Midlands, but especially important to Lilleshall Abbey, the successor institution to the college of St Alkmund in Shrewsbury. The opening remarks of the homily make clear that it was specifically written for St Alkmund's, now a parish church in Shrewsbury: "Therefore comyth to þe chirche, forto worschip God and Saynt Alkamunde, þe whech ys patron of þys chyrche" ("So come to the church to worship God and St. Alkmund, who is the patron of this church.").

In Mirk's telling of his legend, Alkmund was a King of Northumbria who had a wide hegemony. He intervened in a dispute between two vassal states. One side, the "duke of the March and Wales," refused to come to an agreement, and knowing that the other side were guiltless and had little chance of resisting, Alkmund voluntarily joined them in battle and met his inevitable death. However, Mirk then twists the story to argue a much more general point. "Thus Saynt Alkmunde sched his blod, and suffurd dethe for Goddys pepull. Wherfor he ys now an holy martyr befor God and all his angels; wherfor God schowet mony myrakles yn þat plas wher his body bledde." ("Thus St Alkmund shed his blood and suffered for God's people. Hence, he is now a holy martyr before God and all his angels, and so God manifested many miracles in that place where his body bled.")

As with his Corpus Christi homily, Mirk seeks to outflank Lollard criticisms. Where they rejected the cult of saints as a distraction from the central salvific role of Christ, Mirk portrays the saint's sacrificial and altruistic death as imaging Christ's passion. Lollard concerns are not simply dismissed but countered by a reinterpretation of tradition.

Over forty known manuscripts of the Festial are extant but about half diverge greatly from Mirk's original, with much of the local colour removed. It seems that there was a scholarly revision around the mid 15th century, intended to appeal to a more educated audience, and this was the basis of the printed editions. By the time William Caxton printed the Festial in 1483 it was well-established. It was printed in a further 22 editions, both in England and abroad, including a 1493 edition by Wynkyn de Worde, Caxton's associate and successor, who also printed the final edition in 1532. It was still widely read throughout the 16th century but then faded from view.

Interest began to revive after the 1905, when the first volume of Theodore Erbe's edition, based primarily on a Gough manuscript in the Bodleian Library, was published for the Early English Text Society. However, this contained only a text and glossary. Erbe's second volume, intended to contain most of the scholarly apparatus, never appeared and he was killed in World War I. As a result, Ford could write in 2006 that it was "widely known and little studied in the modern academic community, in spite of its medieval popularity." However, Susan Powell, now Emeritus Professor of Medieval Texts and Culture at Salford University, had long campaigned for the recognition of the historical importance of Mirk's work, and in 2009 brought out the first volume of a new edition, also for the Early English Text Society. This is based on a Cotton manuscript in the British Library. The second volume was released in 2011. Erbe's edition remains in print and, being long out of copyright, is available free of charge online.

Instructions for Parish Priests

Instructions for Parish Priests is in lively vernacular verse, using octosyllabic lines and rhyming couplets throughout, and running to 1934 lines. The colophon runs: Explicit tractatus qui dicitur pars oculi, de latino in anglicum translatus per fratrem Johannem myrcus, canonicum regularem Monasterii de Lylleshul, cuius anime propicietur deus! Amen.

Mirk maintains here that he had interpreted the work from a Latin manual called Pars oculi: a title familiar from manuals for the clergy like the Oculus Sacerdotis of William of Pagula, which was widely available in Mirk's time in the form republished by John de Burgh as Pupilla oculi. However, this work is much larger than Mirk's. Another possible influence was the sacerdotal manual by Mirk himself but even this too is far too long to have been the original, and seems moreover to be of later date. The underlying text behind his translation is not known, if it ever existed: it seems more likely that Mirk drew inspiration from the earlier manuals but did not directly translate. Notably, he is here described as a canon of Lilleshall, signifying that this work dates from the period before he became prior of the abbey.

The medieval Catholic Church had expended considerable energy in systematising the basic teachings of its faith. In 1215, the first canon of the Fourth Council of the Lateran had defined conclusively the main points of Catholic dogma that needed to be communicated to all. Archbishop John Peckham turned this into a clear list for his Archdiocese of Canterbury in the Lambeth Constitutions of 1281, which promulgated a manual known as the Ignorantia sacerdotum. John of Thoresby went further, largely reiterating Peckham's pronouncements but also having them adapted and expanded into a vernacular verse document, known as the Lay Folks' Catechism for his Archdiocese of York, in 1357. Both these catechetical manuals set out six key areas to cover: The Creed (condensed to a 14-point summary), the Ten Commandments, The Seven Sacraments, the Seven Deeds of Mercy, the Seven Virtues, the Seven Deadly Sins.

Mirk's work falls well within this catechetical tradition. He was aware that many priests could draw on little learning in giving counsel to their flock.

Initially, Mirk's themes are loosely connected but unsystematic. He gives the priests general instructions on leading a chaste and austere life. He then moves suddenly from stressing a priest's preaching duties to a series of injunctions on baptism, childbirth, and the role of midwives, stressing the imperative need to deliver a child surgically from a dead mother so it can be baptised in case of emergency – even if necessary to call on a man's help. Consideration is then given to the role of godparents at baptism and confirmation, consanguinity and betrothal, lechery, avoidance of incest, pederasty and adultery. Then follows a diversion into the Real presence of Christ in the Eucharist and its consequences for Eucharistic practice. Various injunctions are then delivered, e.g. games must not be played in churchyards; tithes are to paid scrupulously; witchcraft is evil; but usury is especially galling to Jesus, and exploitative pricing is usury by another name.

Once this excursus is finished, however, Mirk essentially follows the six points of the Lay Folks' Catechism. He gives the text of the Lord's Prayer and the short form of the Hail Mary then in use, both in English. Then comes consideration of the Apostles' Creed, which is then versified and divided into fourteen articles; a summary of the seven sacraments, followed by detailed consideration of baptism, confirmation and confession. This provided a narrative thread as the theme of confession leads naturally into questioning a penitent. The framework for this interrogation is provided by Ten Commandments, the Seven Deadly Sins, the Seven Deeds of Mercy, and the Seven Virtues, each considered in relation to the corresponding sin. Penance is then explained, followed by the Last rites, of which it forms a part. After a series of instructions for those that are "mene of lore," the least learned priests, Mirk's conclusion asks that the reader pray for the author.

Only seven manuscripts of the Instructions survive, although the fact that it was a manual intended for regular use suggests that many may have been lost through wear and tear. An edition, prepared for the Early English Text Society by Edward Peacock, was published in 1868 and revised in 1902 by Frederick James Furnivall. As these are out of copyright, both versions are now freely available online. A modern critical edition was produced in Sweden in 1974 by Gillis Kristensson of Lund University.

Manuale Sacerdotis

The  Manuale Sacerdotis or Priest's Handbook seems to date from about 1400 – rather later than Mirk's other works, and when he was prior of Lilleshall. Like the Instructions, it seems to draw on William of Pagula's work, but it has an entirely different agenda from Mirk's earlier work. Instead of providing simple instruction in doctrine and practice, it aims to provide an understanding of the meaning and role of the priesthood. This accounts for Mirk's decision to write in Latin prose, as the audience is assumed to be better-educated. It is addressed to a friend of Mirk, named as "John, vicar of A." It has been conjectured that he was John Sotton, who was vicar of St Alkmund's from 1414, and he is called "John de S" in some manuscripts. This is not simply a preliminary dedication: John is continually addressed throughout the book.

Mirk begins by contrasting the good priest with the modern priest, who is distracted by the vanities of secular life. He proceeds to a detailed account of the priest's activities, including the canonical hours and celebration of the Eucharist. Here, as he considers the focus of the priestly office, he explicitly responds to Lollardy, explaining in detail the doctrine of Transubstantiation. He re-uses the story of St Oda that he employed in his homily for Corpus Christi.

Mirk's underlying purpose seems to be to make clear the correlation between the external activity to the inner life, which for Mirk, involves the following of a rule: “life without a rule is nothing less than dying.” While Mirk follows a written rule, he commends to the priest the principles inherent in Christ's own life.

The Manuale has been overshadowed by the Festial and the Instructions, not least because it is in Latin and probably never had the wide readership of the vernacular works. Thirteen extant manuscripts are known. It has not yet been printed, although a critical edition by Susan Powell and James Girsch, based on Bodleian Library MS Bodley 632, is planned.

Footnotes

References

G C Baugh and C R Elrington (editors), D C Cox, J R Edwards, R C Hill, Ann J Kettle, R Perren, Trevor Rowley and P A Stamper (1989). “Domesday Book: 1300–1540”, in A History of the County of Shropshire: Volume 4, Agriculture, p. 72–118, Institute of Historical Research. Retrieved 9 December 2014.
Barbara Coulton (2010). Regime and Religion: Shrewsbury 1400–1700, Logaston Press, .
Theodore Erbe (editor) (1905). Mirk's Festial: a Collection of Homilies, Kegan Paul et al., for the Early English Text Society. Retrieved 4 December 2014 at Internet Archive.
Judy Ann Ford (2006). John Mirk's Festial: Orthodoxy, Lollardy and the Common People in Fourteenth Century England, D.S. Brewer, Cambridge, . Retrieved 8 December 2014 at Google Books.
A T Gaydon, R B Pugh (Editors), M J Angold, G C Baugh, Marjorie M Chibnall, D C Cox, Revd D T W Price, Margaret Tomlinson, B S Trinder (1973). A History of the County of Shropshire: Volume 2, Institute of Historical Research. Retrieved 9 December 2014.
 Hugh Owen and John Brickdale Blakeway(1825). A History of Shrewsbury, Volume 2, Harding and Lepard, London. Retrieved 16 November 2014 at Internet Archive.
Edward Peacock (editor), revised by F.J. Furnivall (1902). Instructions for Parish Priests by John Myrc, Trübner. Retrieved 12 December 2014 at Internet Archive.

Susan Powell. (2009) John to John: the Manuale Sacerdotis and the Daily Life of a Parish Priest in Recording Medieval Lives, Harlaxton Medieval Studies No.17, Shaun Tyas, 2009, posted at medievalists.net. Retrieved 9 December 2014.
J.S. Roskell, L. Clark, C. Rawcliffe (editors) (1993). The History of Parliament: the House of Commons 1386–1421, Constituencies and Members, History of Parliament Trust. Retrieved 9 December 2014.
Thomas Frederick Simmons and Henry Edward Nolloth (eds.) (1901). The Lay Folk's Catechism, Kegan Paul et al., for the Early English Text Society. Retrieved 12 December 2014 at Internet Archive.

Further reading

Modern editions of works by Mirk:

G. Kristensson (editor) (1974). Instructions for parish priests, Lund Studies in English, 49, Gleerup. .
Susan Powell (editor). John Mirk's Festial, 2 vols, Early English Text Society, Oxford.
Volume 1 (2009) .
Volume 2 (2011) .

External links
Photograph of a leaf of Festial with a printed volume of the Golden Legend. at Incunabula Project blog, Cambridge University Library. Retrieved 10 December 2014.

Augustinian canons
Clergy from Shropshire
14th-century births
15th-century deaths
14th-century Latin writers
15th-century Latin writers
14th-century English writers
15th-century English writers
Middle English literature
English male writers
Writers from Shropshire